Lip Service is a 1988 American comedy TV film directed by William H. Macy and written by Howard Korder. The film stars Griffin Dunne, Paul Dooley, Jonathan Katz, Fran Brill, John C. Jones and Felicity Huffman. The film premiered on HBO on October 17, 1988.

Plot

Cast 
Griffin Dunne as Lennard 'Len' Burdette
Paul Dooley as Gilbert 'Gil' Hutchinson
Jonathan Katz as Jerry
Fran Brill as Debbie
John C. Jones as Hank
Felicity Huffman as Woman P.A.
Scott Zigler as Salesman #1
Colin Stinton as Salesman #2
Christopher Kaldor as 'Hunter' 
Raynor Scheine as Walter the 'Weather Moose'
Brenda Huggins as Reporter
Michael Feingold as Warren Yarlsberg

References

External links
 

1988 television films
1988 films
American comedy films
1988 comedy films
HBO Films films
Films directed by William H. Macy
1980s English-language films
1980s American films